Alter Friedhof (Old Cemetery) is a historically significant cemetery in Bonn, Germany,  in area, located near the center of the modern city.

The cemetery was established in 1715 as a cemetery for soldiers and strangers, outside the city walls of the time. It remained in regular use until the new North cemetery opened in 1884, after which burials gradually ceased. It is an area of greenery in the middle of the modern city.

Notable burials or monuments
 Ella Adayevskaya, Russian composer, pianist, and ethnomusicologist
 Friedrich Wilhelm Argelander, astronomer
 Ernst Moritz Arndt, author and poet
 Johann Baptista Baltzer, Catholic theologian
 August Beer, scientist
 Maria Magdalena van Beethoven, mother of Ludwig van Beethoven
 Gustav Bischof, chemist
 Sulpiz Boisserée, art collector, art historian
 Heinrich Carl Breidenstein, musicologist
 Rudolf Clausius, physicist and mathematician
 Friedrich Christoph Dahlmann, historian and politician
 Heinrich Geißler, glassblower and physicist
 William Keogh, Irish judge
 Franz Peter Knoodt, Catholic theologian and church historian
 August Macke, painter
 Otto Gottlieb Mohnike, physician and naturalist
 Karl Friedrich Mohr, chemist
 Christian Friedrich Nasse, physician and psychiatrist
 Wilhelm Neuland, composer and conductor
 Barthold Georg Niebuhr, historian, statesman
 Johann Jakob Nöggerath, mineralogist, geologist
 Julius Plücker, mathematician and physicist
 Elsa Reger, wife of Max Reger and founder of the Max-Reger-Institute
 Joseph Hubert Reinkens, first German Old Catholic bishop
 Franz Anton Ries, violinist; he taught Beethoven violin
 Agnes Salm-Salm, American wife of soldier Felix Salm-Salm
 Hermann Schaaffhausen, anatomist, paleoanthropologist, studied Neanderthal remains
 Mildred Scheel, physician and founder of German Cancer Aid; wife of German president Walter Scheel
 August Wilhelm Schlegel, poet, translator, and leading German Romantic
 Adele Schopenhauer, an author, sister of the philosopher Arthur Schopenhauer
 Clara Schumann and Robert Schumann, musicians and composers
 Karl Joseph Simrock, poet, mythologist, translator of the Nibelungenlied
 Peter Slodowy, mathematician
 Franz Hermann Troschel, zoologist
 Hermann Usener, scholar of philology and comparative religion
 Gerhard vom Rath, mineralogist
 Charlotte von Lengefeld, writer, wife of Schiller
 Mathilde Wesendonck, poet, author, and friend of Richard Wagner
 Ferdinand Zirkel, geologist, petrographer

References

External links

 

Bonn
Cemeteries in Germany